Canning Creek is a stream in Morris County, Kansas, in the United States.

Canning Creek is named after Nancy Canning, a pioneer settler.

See also
List of rivers of Kansas

References

Rivers of Morris County, Kansas
Rivers of Kansas